Fort Deposit–Lowndes County Airport  is a city-owned public-use airport located one nautical mile (2 km) southwest of Fort Deposit, a town in Lowndes County, Alabama, United States. The airport is closed indefinitely.

Facilities and aircraft 
Fort Deposit–Lowndes County Airport covers an area of 55 acres (22 ha) at an elevation of 490 feet (149 m) above mean sea level. It has one runway designated 15/33 with an asphalt surface measuring 3,593 by 78 feet (1,095 x 24 m). For the 12-month period ending August 19, 2010, the airport had 200 general aviation aircraft operations, an average of 16 per month.

See also 
 List of airports in Alabama

References

External links 
 Aerial image as of 14 March 1992 from USGS The National Map

Airports in Alabama
Transportation in Lowndes County, Alabama
Buildings and structures in Lowndes County, Alabama